William R. Collins (September 23, 1928 – April 8, 2006) was an American professional golfer who played on the PGA Tour in the 1950s and 1960s and the Senior PGA Tour in the 1980s.

Life
Collins was born in Meyersdale, Pennsylvania and grew up in Baltimore, Maryland.

Collins joined the PGA Tour in 1958 and won four events between 1959 and 1962. His first victory came at the 1959 Greater New Orleans Open Invitational by three strokes (280) over Jack Burke Jr. and Tom Nieporte. In 1960, Collins finished in a three-way tie for first at the end of regulation at the Insurance City Open, which he and Jack Fleck lost in a playoff to Arnold Palmer. His best finishes in major championships were T-7 at The Masters in 1961 and a 7th-place finish at the 1964 U.S. Open. He was a member of the victorious 1961 Ryder Cup team.

Collins was forced to quit the Tour after back surgery in 1963. In 1965, he took a club pro job at Brae Burn Country Club in Purchase, New York and remained there until December 1981. He joined the Senior PGA Tour in 1982 and won the Greater Syracuse Senior's Pro Golf Classic in his first full season.

Collins died in Woodstock, Georgia at the age of 77.

Professional wins (7)

PGA Tour wins (4)

PGA Tour playoff record (1–3)

Other wins (2)
1956 Metropolitan PGA Championship
1975 Metropolitan PGA Championship

Senior PGA Tour wins (1)

U.S. national team appearances
Professional
Ryder Cup: 1961 (winners)

References

External links

American male golfers
PGA Tour golfers
PGA Tour Champions golfers
Ryder Cup competitors for the United States
Golfers from Pennsylvania
Golfers from New York (state)
People from Somerset County, Pennsylvania
People from Purchase, New York
1928 births
2006 deaths